In algebraic geometry, universal algebraic geometry generalizes the geometry of rings to geometries of arbitrary varieties of algebras, so that every variety of algebras has its own algebraic geometry. The two terms algebraic variety and variety of algebras should not be confused.

See also
Algebraic geometry
Universal algebra

References
Seven Lectures on the Universal Algebraic Geometry

Algebraic geometry
Universal algebra